Statistics of DPR Korea Football League in the 2008 season.

Overview
Amrokkang won both the championship, and the 2008 edition of the Man'gyŏngdae Prize.

References

DPR Korea Football League seasons
1
Korea
Korea